Rhabdocosma aglaophanes is a moth of the  family Ypsolophidae. It is found in Japan.

The wingspan is 14–18 mm.

Larvae feed on Celastraceae species.

External links
 Japanese Moths

Ypsolophidae
Moths of Japan